Catherine Văn-Davies (born 1985 or 1986) is an Australian actress with Vietnamese heritage.

Biography  
Văn-Davies' mother was a refugee from Vietnam who arrived in Australia at the age of 18 (see boat people).  Văn-Davies was born In Canberra, spent a part of early childhood in Indonesia and her school years in Brisbane, Queensland. After graduating from high school she first studied for business degree at the Queensland University of Technology but then switched to acting and earned a Bachelor of Fine Arts in 2006. Văn-Davies couldn't get an acting job for three years, her for first job was finally a well paid role in a TV commercial. She used the money to take acting further at the HB Studio in New York City.

After returning to Australia Văn-Davies moved to Sydney and worked mostly in theater. She played in different theaters in Sydney and also toured nationally with plays. In 2019 she won a Sydney Theatre Award for Angels in America (best female support) and another one for White Pearl (best ensemble).

In addition to her theater work  Văn-Davies also appeared in  couple of Australian TV series, most notable in Hungry Ghosts (2020) and Amazing Grace (2021).

Văn-Davies is in a relationship with fellow Australian actor Fayssal Bazzi since 2014.

Filmography 
 2018: Fighting Sean
 2019: The Letdown
 2020: Liberty Street
 2020: Hungry Ghosts
 2021: Amazing Grace
 2022: Barons

External links

References 

Living people
Australian television actresses
Year of birth missing (living people)
Australian film actresses
21st-century Australian actresses
Australian people of Vietnamese descent